Cefaloglycin INN (also spelled cephaloglycin) is a first-generation cephalosporin antibiotic.

References
 
 

Cephalosporin antibiotics
Acetate esters
Enantiopure drugs